Bob Leatherbarrow (born 3 May 1955) is a jazz drummer and vibraphonist who lives and works in Los Angeles.

Leatherbarrow was born in Buffalo, New York. During his career, Leatherbarrow has played with Rosemary Clooney, Natalie Cole, Peggy Lee, and Ernie Watts, His debut album as leader, Bumpin' in the Basement, was released in 1999.

References

External links
Official site

1970 births
Living people
American jazz drummers
American jazz composers
American male jazz composers
American session musicians
20th-century American drummers
American male drummers
21st-century American drummers
20th-century American male musicians
21st-century American male musicians
American jazz vibraphonists